Berlin Historic District may refer to:

Berlin Historic District (Berlin, Nevada), listed on the National Register of Historic Places (NRHP)
Berlin Historic District (Berlin, New Jersey), NRHP-listed in Camden County
New Berlin Historic District, New Berlin, New York, NRHP-listed
East Berlin Historic District, East Berlin, Pennsylvania, NRHP-listed
Berlin Historic District (Berlin, Tennessee), NRHP-listed in Marshall County

See also
Berlin (disambiguation)